Garwood is a New Jersey Transit (NJT) railroad station on the Raritan Valley Line, in Garwood, New Jersey.  There are two short, low platforms on each side, long enough for 2 cars only. Passengers using the inbound platform must cross over a siding track. Access to neighboring stations is available on the 59 or 113 bus to Newark and New York, traveling between Cranford and Westfield stations. Since June 2011, a ticket vending machine (TVM) has been available on the inbound platform. The former Jersey Central Railroad depot, built in 1892, burned in an early morning fire on June 30, 1976.

Garwood station has been identified as the western terminus of the Union go bus expressway, a proposed bus rapid transit line utilizing the a portion of the abandoned Central Railroad of New Jersey (CNJ) right-of-way between it and Midtown Station, a transit hub combining the NJT station and the former CNJ station in Elizabeth.

Station layout
The station has two low-level side platforms. The northbound outer track has been removed and the southbound outer track is not built for platform access. Access to the Track 2 platform requires crossing Track 4 at grade.

References

External links

world.nycsubway.org - NJT Raritan Line
 Center Street entrance from Google Maps Street View

NJ Transit Rail Operations stations
Railway stations in Union County, New Jersey
Former Central Railroad of New Jersey stations
Railway stations in the United States opened in 1892